Mokronozi is a village in the municipality of Rudo, Republic of Srpska, Bosnia and Herzegovina. It is on the border between Serbia and Srpska.  According to Population Census in 2013, the whole population of this village is 458.

References

Villages in Republika Srpska
Populated places in Rudo